K-Ming Chang (born 1998) is a novelist and poet. She is the author of the novel Bestiary (2020). Bestiary was long-listed for the Center for Fiction First Novel Prize and the PEN/Faulkner Award for Fiction in 2021. In 2018 she published a poetry collection, Past Lives, Future Bodies.

Personal life
K-Ming Chang was born in 1998, the year of the tiger, and grew up in California. In elementary school, Chang wrote a story about a girl who turns into a tiger; she later recalled it, humorously, as a "really terrible" story. This story contained the seeds of her eventual first novel, Bestiary. Chang currently lives in New York.

Writing 
Chang is the Micro editor at The Offing magazine.

Past Lives, Future Bodies 
Chang published Past Lives, Future Bodies in 2018 with Black Lawrence Press. The chapbook takes up themes of matrilineality contrasted with "volatile masculinity", writes Luiza Flynn-Goodlett. In her review, Flynn-Goodlett praised the "magic conjured in this collection—lyric intensity coupled with sharp political intellect", saying "Chang emerges as an urgent, sumptuous voice, a poet of numerous gifts and intellectual dexterity". Several critics remark on Chang’s use of line breaks; in The Rumpus, Torrin A. Greathouse says they "become a blade, a letter's crease, a hinge opening the next line like a room. Her chapbook is a master class in the potential of enjambment, imbuing each break with the wonder of and trepidation of the unknown."

Bestiary 
Chang published her debut novel Bestiary in 2020. She wrote it in her sophomore year in college while she was at home on summer break, taking summer courses on Asian American history. She sold Bestiary to One World, Chris Jackson's imprint at Random House, while still an undergraduate. Another poetry collection was also part of the book deal.

The novel tells the story of three generations of women, Daughter, Mother and Grandmother, who move from Taiwan to Arkansas. After hearing Mother tell the folktale of Hu Gu Po, a tiger spirit who eats children to try to become human, Daughter grows a tiger tail and develops powers she doesn't understand or know how to use. In a review for The New York Times, Amil Niazi contrasts Bestiary with immigrant literature organized around nostalgia and other sentimentality: instead, Bestiary is "full of magic realism that reaches down your throat, grabs hold of your guts and forces a slow reckoning with what it means to be a foreigner, a native, a mother, a daughter — and all the things in between." In a review for the Star Tribune, May-Lee Chai says Chang’s novel “reinvents the genres of immigrant novel, queer coming-of-age story, and mother-and-daughter tale.”

Bone House 
In 2021, Chang's micro-chapbook Bone House was released by Bull City Press as part of their Inch series. The collection functions as a queer Taiwanese-American retelling of Wuthering Heights, in which an unnamed narrator moves into a butcher's mansion "with a life of its own."

Other work 
Chang’s poetry was included in the 2019 Pushcart Anthology. She has a short-story collection entitled Gods of Want forthcoming from One World.

Honors
In 2018, Chang was named a Gregory Djanikian Scholar in Poetry by The Adroit Journal. She has also been a Kundiman Fellow. In 2019, Chang was a finalist for the Lambda Literary Award in the lesbian poetry category for her collection Past Lives, Future Bodies. In 2020, she was awarded the National Book Foundation's "5 Under 35" prize (selected by previous honoree Justin Torres). In 2021, her novel Bestiary was long-listed for the PEN/Faulkner Award for Fiction and the Center for Fiction First Novel Prize.

References

External links
 Personal website
 Biography on Poets.org
 Interview in the Asian American Writers' Workshop (AAWW) Magazine
 Interview in the Rumpus Magazine

American women writers
21st-century American poets
21st-century American novelists
1998 births
Living people
21st-century American women writers
American people of Taiwanese descent